Krasimir (Bulgarian: Красимир) is a common masculine given name in Bulgaria. It is derived from the words: krasi "beauty, adornment", and mir "peace" or "world". An alternate spelling is Krassimir. The feminine form is: Krasimira / Krassimira (Красимира). The name may refer to:

Krasimir
Krasimir Balakov (born 1966), Bulgarian former footballer turned manager
Krasimir Bezinski, former Bulgarian football player
Krasimir Borisov (born 1950), former Bulgarian football midfielder
Krasimir Dimitrov (born 1971), Bulgarian footballer
Krasimir Durchov (born 1979), football defender from Bulgaria
Krasimir Georgiev (born 1986), Bulgarian footballer
Krasimir Khristov (born 1953), Bulgarian sprint canoeist
Krasimir Kolev (born 1971), former Bulgarian goalkeeper
Krasimir Krastev (born 1984), association football player from Bulgaria
Krasimir Radkov (born 1971), Bulgarian comedy actor (television and theatre)
Krasimir Zafirov (born 1950), retired Bulgarian football player and now coach

Krassimir
Krassimir Atanassov (born 1954), Bulgarian mathematician
Krassimir Avramov (born 1969), singer and songwriter
Krassimir Chomakov (born 1977), Bulgarian football player
Krassimir Damianov (born 1948), Bulgarian writer and civil engineer
Krassimir Guergov (born 1961), Bulgarian businessman
Krassimir Taskov (born 1955), Bulgarian pianist and composer

See also
 Krešimir
 Krzesimir
 Krassi

Other
Krasimir, village in Dalgopol Municipality, Varna Province, Bulgaria

Slavic masculine given names
Bulgarian masculine given names